Balika Vadhu 2 ( 2) is an Indian dramatic television series that aired on Colors TV from 9 August 2021 to 25 February 2022 and on Voot from 28 February 2022 to 29 March 2022. It is a reboot of the long-running series Balika Vadhu. Produced by Sphere Origins, its cast includes Shivangi Joshi, Randeep Rai, and Samridh Bawa.

The show is divided into 2 parts. The first part is titled Balika Vadhu - Kachchee Umar ke Pakke Rishte ("Strong Relationship at a Young Age"). The second part is titled Balika Vadhu - Anandi Ka Naya Safar ("Anandi's New Journey").

Plot

Khimji and Premji are introduced as best friends who live in the village of Devgarh, where Khimji is the sarpanch. Khimji's wife Ratan is pregnant with their second child. Both families hope for the birth of a baby girl, who can be married to Premji's five-year-old son, Jigar. After a difficult and dramatic birth, daughter Anandi is born. Anandi is favoured by both families, making Jigar and his brother Gopal jealous. Jigar acts out violently, but Gopal tries other ways of gaining attention. When Anandi turns forty days, Premji asks for Anandi's hand in marriage because the timing is very auspicious. The custom of child marriage is controversial within the village, but Khimji eventually agrees. The ceremony is held in secret. Premji reconciles with his family and moves back in with his father and ailing mother.

8 years later
Anandi has grown up to be a spirited young girl, unaware of her marriage. Premji's mother is sick and is deteriorating day by day due to her mean elder daughter, Diwali. She asks Premji to fulfill her last wish: the Gauna of Anandi. At the same time, Khimji's family is evicted from their home. Premji brings them all to his new haveli.

Anandi is happy to go to her friend Kanku's house without knowing that her Gauna is occurring. Anandi's parents are upset and sad about their daughter's child marriage and think they have made a big mistake. The family goes to Khimji's house and marriage customs start. Anandi is forced to cook while fasting all day. Seeing this, Premji's mother looks happy and her health improves. 

Diwali does not like Premji and his family and starts to hate Anandi and makes her life miserable after her Gauna. Anandi is asked to live in Premji's house by Premji's mother. Anandi's family leaves a sad Anandi at Premji's. Her Kaku and Kaki make her happy. Jigar, who initially disliked Anandi, begins to care for her. 

Maddi Baa (Taye) is Premji's aunt. She comes and Anandi tackles her by mistake, unaware of her relationship. Maadi Baa mistreats Anandi and scolds her. Maadi Baa had come to see Premji's mother after hearing of her sickness. When Maadi Baa goes to Premji's house, she learns that Anandi is her paut bahu (grandniece-in-law) and Jigar's wife. She is surprised to know this and mistreats her. Maadi Baa loves Diwali and her daughter but dislikes Premji and his family. Anandi wants to go home after the torture and runs away, but Jigar saves her. 

After realising that Anandi doesn't know about her marriage, Madi Baa develops a soft spot for her. She returns home with her parents. Soon, Premji's mother dies and Anandi returns to Kaku's house. Madi Baa advises Premji to keep Anandi there as their bahu. Premji tries to convince Khemji and Anandi, but a traumatized Anandi returns home and Premji breaks all ties with them. 

Ratan discovers that her brother beats his wife daily because she cannot conceive, even though the doctor tells him that he is sterile. In anger, he beats her more. Anandi discovers this and calls her mother. Leela decides to consider Dhingli as her daughter, because she doesn't have a mother. Actually, Dhingli's mother was Leela's sister. Soon, Premji's business fails. Madi Baa tells Premji to bring Anandi back as she is their Bhagya Lakshi. Anandi is kidnapped by Premji. Initially wanting to return home, Anandi learns of the marriage and makes a final decision to stay at her in-law's house, thinking that her parents have lied to her.

Premji's business partners Mehul and Bhairavi come to Premji's house from the U.S. to invest in his business. Their son Anand and Anandi meet on the way to save a puppy. Premji and his family enjoy Anand's company. Anand is staying at Anandi's house to celebrate his first Indian Diwali. He makes Anandi laugh. She had been depressed after leaving her parents' house. Anand and Anandi become friends. Jiger often plots against Anand to break their friendship, because Anand is better than him in all aspects. Jigar and Anandi's marriage is kept a secret because Bhairavi is a woman's activist.

A marriage proposal comes for Kanku who is in love with Madhav, her classmate. Kanku has a dosh in her horoscope and is asked by the pandit to marry a tree. Anand is distracted from the scene and Kanku marries a tree. Afterward, Anand is told that a puja was in the house. Anandi is told to clean up and Anand decides to help her. They take seven rounds around the 'Agni' while collecting flowers. Kanku, upset with her wedding talk, asks for help from Anand, Jigar, and Anandi. Anand plans to help Kanku and Madhav elope with the help of Anandi, who dislikes the plan. Jigar refuses to help, but hears the conversation and uses this to drive a wedge between Anand and Anandi. The plan fails when Madhav declares that he will wed Kanku only with her family's permission, and brings Kanku to the temple. Everyone including Jigar accuses Anand of causing the problem, while Madhav vows that he will marry Kanku only when he is successful and leaves. A heartbroken Anandi asks a shocked Anand to leave and never return and breaks all ties with him.

10 years later
Anand, Anandi, and Jigar have all grown up. Anand is a sweet and intelligent young man, motivating everyone to follow their heart's desire, and has returned to India after ten years away. Jigar became a hooligan and teases women on the street. Anandi is almost 18 and is constantly reminded by Jigar that she is his wife, that they will soon consummate their relationship, and that her only job for the rest of her life is to be his wife. Premji and his family are invited to Anand's sister Diya's engagement to Vikrant. At the engagement, Jigar misbehaves with Anandi and Anand sees this, but he does not recognize who they are. Anand's parents introduce him to Anandi and Jigar, who he realizes is the couple he had known before. He remembers happy moments with Anandi, but Anandi vows that she will never forgive Anand for what he did to Kanku, who got no marriage proposal for ten years. During the engagement, Kanku's family tries to arrange her marriage, but Anandi collapses the charade, which causes the arrangement to fail. 

Madhav married someone else. Anandi passes her entrance exam for a college in Ahmedabad with a scholarship and asks Sejal to let her stay in Ahmedabad and study. Jigar overhears their conversation and disagrees with Anandi's decision. She confronts Jigar and pleads with him to give her three years, but he says that if she pleases him on their first night, he will think about her plight. He gifts her some lingerie, leaving Anandi embarrassed. She is left with no choice but to go home. Anand tries to talk to his mother, to help Anandi study, but she refuses to help due to Anjaariya's antipathy towards their family and their outdated customs. When Anandi is leaving, Anand gifts her some books and gives her his number but Jigar throws the books out the window of his car.

At home, for her eighteenth birthday Anandi is gifted a wedding dress, along with sindoor, mangalsutra, and other items a bride should wear, as she is now officially the family's bahu. Madi Baa holds a wedding reception for her and Jigar, which Anandi does not appreciate. After the party, Madi Baa tells her that a wife's only job is to please her husband and serve her in-laws. Anandi asks Jigar to start their relationship as friends, but he refuses and tries to force Anandi into a physical relationship. She gives him milk that he throws at the mirror, leaving glass all over the floor. Anandi runs away, with pieces of glass stabbing her feet. Anand leaves for the airport and is feeling discomfort in the car. Anandi almost meets with an accident in front of Anand's car. Anand is shocked to see her in a wedding dress and questions her about the sindoor and her bridal look. She asks him for help and faints. Anand carries her to the hospital and invites the NGO workers and Bhairavi to support Anandi. 

Anandi protects Jigar in front of the workers and is taken home where she revolts and refuses to be with Jigar. She requests three years to study before she takes responsibility for the family. Premji supports her studying. The NGO workers and the police do not know of Anandi's child marriage with Jigar. Anand secretly comes to meet Anandi and questions why she did not speak up against Jigar and why she married him. She says that this is none of his business and begins to feel sick. Anand leaves as he thinks Anandi feels stressed. As he is about to leave, Anandi thanks him and tries to be friends with him. He is reminded of the hospital sequence and leaves without friending her, leaving Anandi shocked.

A few days later, Anand disguises himself as 'Jignesh' and enters Anandi's house pretending to be an NGO worker and tries to see whether Anandi is fine and is not being abused by her family. He convinces them to let her study. Premji agrees and lets Anandi go to Ahmedabad. They convince Bhairavi to let Anandi stay at her house and Madi Baa comes with her. Jigar is annoyed and insecure that Anandi has left him to study and is now living in Anand's house. Premji advises Jigar to treat Anandi with love and not force her into the relationship. Anandi works out that Anand was Jignesh, though they keep it a secret. Anand decides not to return to the U.S. as Anandi may need his help. 

Anand's relationship with his mother goes poorly. On her first day of college, Anandi is ridiculed for her behenji look, and she reciprocates. Jigar comes to her college and proposes to her in front of everyone with flowers and a banner, leaving her embarrassed. Anand enrolls in the same college. Diya's husband's sister Kiara enrolls in the same college and is enticed by Anand's looks and friends. Jigar sees Anand and is mad that he did not leave for the U.S and gets into a fight with him, though he is removed from the campus as he is not a student. Jigar tries to get Anand ejected from the college by framing him for sexual assault. His friend pays someone in the university to falsely accuse Anand. Anandi believes that Anand can do nothing wrong. She works out that Jigar is behind this and is challenged by him to choose between her husband and Anand. She eventually exposes the girl 'Shreya' with the help of Kiara. She gets Anand back in college and does not let Jigar's name come out, helping both.

A fresher's party is thrown at the university, but Anandi is not able to go. Her seniors rag her and make her set up the party. Anand wants Anandi to see what a fresher's night is like. Over the phone, he pretends to be the principal and tells Anandi to bring cake to the party or see her grades cut. She requests Anand to take her to the party. Diya dresses up as Anandi to massage Madi Baa's feet. Anand gets on his bike and asks Anandi to hold on. At the party, Anandi is told to dance for the freshers vs seniors. She wins and the jealous senior girls hide her bag. Jigar comes to the party and sees Anandi. Anand and Anandi get locked in a storeroom by the senior girls. As she is looking for an escape, her magmangal sutraeaks and she panics. Anand tells her to relax and asks her why this is so important. He questions why she married Jigar. He says that he has seen her discomfort around Jigar and that she does not love him. She tells him that this marriage was her destiny and she had no choice. 

Some feathers come into the storeroom and Anandi starts dancing as Jigar opens the room, Anandi falls on Anand. Jigar acts very nice to Anandi and supports her when Madi Baa scolds her. Anandi gets sick and Jigar takes care of her. Anand sees this and gets sad. He is unable to realize why he is sad, because Jigar and Anandi are spouses. He cuts himself while cutting an apple. Diya gives him first aid. She asks what is his problem. He tells her that his heart hurts to see Anandi suffer. Diya is worried that Anand has fallen in love with Anandi and tells him that she is already married. Anand spends all night outside Anandi's room as he does not trust Jigar. Jigar challenges Anand that he is trying to make a relationship with his wife and that no one can break their relationship.

The next day, Anandi is nowhere to be seen. It turns out that Jigar kidnapped her. Anand eventually works out that Jigar is behind this and also where Anandi might be. Anandi frees herself and presses the buzzer on Anand's app. Anand is thinking of Anandi and almost runs over a child and crashes. He is beaten by the villagers, as was arranged by Jigar. A beaten Anand eventually finds Anandi. But as he opens the door, a blast occurs and the house burns. Jigar comes to save Anandi. He hits Anand on the leg who then cannot get up. He forcefully picks up Anandi. A photo of Jigar and Anandi's child marriage flies over to Anand and he makes sense of what Anandi has said to him. As Jigar picks up the rod to hit Anand, Anandi hits him in the head and the police arrive. Anandi files a complaint against Jigar. 

Vikrant is stealing from Diya to pay his debt. Jigar is in jail. Jigar's family gives Anandi medicine to render her unconscious so she can be taken to Raigarh, but the lawyer arrives in time. Sejal and Madi Baa try to burn Ratan's letter to Anandi, but she finds it as it does not burn. The letter reveals that if she is not happy with her marriage she can end it. Anandi, angry at her family, dresses up in her mother's saree and goes to meet Jigar. Jigar is out of jail and puts Anandi in jail in an attempt to upend the case. Anand arrives and is beaten by the police and is also imprisoned. 

Anandi often cries and Anand tells her not to cry. He stays awake the entire night looking at her. In the morning, Mehul bails out Anand but not Anandi as Madi Baa had blamed Anand and his family for the drama. Anand refuses to go without Anandi. Jigar bails out Anandi. She pours water on herself to remove the sindoor and breaks all ties with Jigar. She files an annulment case, which angers her family. Anand is happy that she did this for herself.

On the day of Uttarayan, Anandi and Anand and Jigar and his friend have a kite-flying competition that Anandi wins. Jigar's family breaks all ties with Anandi. Madi Baa blames Anand and Bhairavi, leading Bhairavi and Mehul to ask Madi Baa and everyone to leave the house. They break all ties with the Anjaariyas. Bhairavi then asks Anandi to leave as she has promised the Anjariyas not to interfere in Anandi's life, much to Anand's dismay. Anand begs his mother to let Anandi stay but she refuses. She asks him to take an oath upon their mother-son relationship to never meet Anandi. He is left with no choice and cries when Anandi leaves. Anandi understands Anand's situation and leaves. 

Anand asks Kiara to help Anandi and gives her a stay in her house. Anandi goes to Kiara's house. The next day, Anandi's lawyer backs out because Bhairavi does not pay for the case. Anand is angered at his mother for doing this. She questions him as to why everything Anandi is involved in excites him. She asks whether there is something between him and Anandi, as Jigar suggested. He answers yes, saying they are friends. He also reveals that he has feelings for Anandi but they are not involved. She tells Anand that he will not help her and to not use her money to help her. Anand feels sad and returns all his cash and cards and thanks his mother.

Anandi meets Usha Sachdeva, an annulment lawyer who agrees to represent her. She sees her mother's photo and realises her mother's jewellery is in Raigarh and she can sell it to pay him. Anand tries to sell his women empowerment app, saying that what is the point of the app, if he cannot help a girl in need. Anandi dresses up as a mandali dancer and enters the house to get her mother's jewellery. She asks Kanku for help. Anand comes to help Anandi, disguised as a flower vendor. Anandi obtains the jewellery, but gets caught. Anand saves her by throwing kumkum in Jigar's eyes. She reaches the terrace and jumps into the flower truck. Anand then drives her away. Anandi realises that Anand helped her and is angry that he didn't answer her calls. He doesn't tell her about the oath.

At Kiara's house, Anandi accidentally cuts her wrist with broken glass. Kiara worries and calls Anand. Anandi asks Anand for her and Jigar's photo of child marriage since the first hearing of the case is the next day. He leaves and at night, he sends balloons with an envelope, with her child marriage photos. The next day, Anandi is late for her hearing and Jigar troubles her on the way, by harassing her and trying to get the evidence. Kanku calls Anand and tells him that Jigar is planning to do something wrong with Anandi. Anandi manages to reach court late but as she is presenting the photo, it turns out that Jigar had changed it. Jigar tells the court that their wedding was conducted on Anandi's eighteenth birthday by showing photos of the reception and a new date is given for the case.

Anandi's lawyer tells her that she needs to find a witness to her child marriage. It is revealed that Anand is Mehul and Bhairavi's adopted son as Jigar threatens to pronounce the truth to everyone. Anandi faints and Anand brings her to his home, much to his mother's dismay. Anand's mother is angered and asks him why he bought her there. She tells him to move back to the U.S. but he refuses. He tells his mother that he loves Anandi and everyone is shocked.

Anandi regains consciousness and asks to go to Devgarh. Anand tells her not to move from the bed and goes to Devgarh himself. During Bhairavi and Mehul's conversation, it is also revealed that Anand's real mother is alive, and in fact, it was Mehul who impregnated her at age 17. Anand's biological mother is financially supported by Bhairavi as she was her NGO's rescue worker. Bhairavi fears that Anand has gone to Devgarh since his mother lives there. Anand meets his mother in Devgarh through someone's reference, not knowing that she is his mother. His mother's friend- Gauri- shows the video of Anandi's child marriage in the moving truck. He convinces them to come to court. Anand gives Anandi the good news. The court hearing is set for the next day.

Anand goes to pick up the witnesses and Jigar organises a person to make the car break down on the way. The car breaks down. Anand eventually reaches court. Anandi wins the case and her marriage is annulled. Bhairavi tells Sheela (Anand's biological mother) to stay away from them. She eventually realizes Anand is her son, but doesn't meet him due to his lifestyle. Later in the day, Anand confesses his love and proposes to Anandi. As she is about to tell him she always considered him a friend, Jigar comes and ruins the moment. Anand and Jigar get into a fight and Anand pushes Jigar over. Bhairavi sees this and plugs in the wires, causing Jigar to get a shock. She does this so Anand doesn't learn about his biological mother, as Jigar was blackmailing her. Anandi and Anand take Jigar to the hospital and inform Sejal and his family. As they are about to leave, a blast happens in their house due to a gas leak and Madi Baa and Premji die. Anand asks Anandi to settle in the U.S. with him, even as friends, but she refuses and decides to take care of a traumatized Sejal. Jigar falls into a coma. Anand refuses to go to the U.S but is requested by Anandi to do so as she cannot give him anything more than friendship. A heartbroken Anand leaves Anandi after friending her.

3 years later
Anandi runs a successful boutique while also taking care of Jigar and Sejal. It is revealed that Bhairavi has made her a partner in their business and keeps them in her outhouse. Anandi pays the rent from the earnings of the boutique and also pays for Jigar's treatment, who is now paralyzed but improving. This is done by Bhairavi so that she can manipulate Jigar to not tell Anand about his original mother when he is treated. It turns out that Anand is the rape child of Mehul and Sheela. All of Mehul's and Bhairavi's businesses are going into loss except the boutique. A moneylender comes and asks Bhairavi and Mehul to pay their loans as they are now in debt. He gives them three months or their house will be auctioned. Anand returns from the U.S. and tells them not to worry as they still have three months. Anand breaks his friendship with Anandi, who chose Jigar over him. Soon Anand's friend Ishana returns to India. It is later shown that Bhairavi and Ishana know each other and that Bhairavi wishes Ishana to be her daughter-in-law. Soon Anandi experiences feelings for Anand. Diya returns to the Chaturvedi House because of her greedy husband Vikrant who used to abuse Diya. Vikrant married Diya for money. After a series of events Vikrant is exposed. Diya and Vikrant sign the divorce papers and part ways. Bhairavi announces Anand and Ishana's marriage.

2 years later 
Anandi and Anand have a daughter named Vijayta.

Cast

Main
 Shivangi Joshi as Anandi Rawal(nee: Bhujariya) – Ratan and Khimji's daughter; Kalpesh's sister; Jigar's ex-wife; Anand's wife; Vijayta's mother (2021–2022)
 Shreya Patel as Child Anandi Bhujariya (2021)
 Randeep Rai as Anand Rawal – Sheela and Mehul's son; Bhairavi's adoptive son; Diya's half-brother; Anandi's second husband; Vijayta's father (2021–2022)
 Krish Chauhan as Teenage Anand Chaturvedi (2021)
 Samridh Bawa as Jigar Anjariya – Sejal and Premji's elder son; Gopal's brother; Kanku's cousin; Anandi's ex-husband (2021–2022)
 Vansh Sayani as Teenage Jigar Anjariya (2021)

Recurring
 Manasi Salvi as Bhairavi Rawal – Mehul's wife; Diya's mother; Anand's adoptive mother (2021–2022)
 Vimarsh Roshan as Mehul Rawal – Sheela and Bhairavi's husband; Diya and Anand's father; Premji's business partner (2021-2022)
 Ankita Bahuguna as Diya Rawal – Bharaivi and Mehul's daughter; Anand's half-sister; Vikrant's ex-wife (2021–2022)
 Ketki Dave as Gomati Devi Anjariya aka Maadi Baa – Dharamraj's wife; Diwali and Premji's aunt; Jigar, Kanku and Gopal's grandaunt (2021–2022)
 Mehul Buch as Devraj Anjariya – Dharamraj's brother; Bhanumati's husband; Diwali and Premji's father; Jigar, Gopal and Kanku's grandfather (2021)
 Meenakshi Verma as Bhanumati "Bhanu" Anjariya – Devraj's wife; Diwali and Premji's mother; Jigar, Gopal and Kanku's grandmother (2021)
 Sunny Pancholi / Manu Malik as Premji Anjariya – Devraj and Bhanumati's son; Diwali's brother; Sejal's husband; Jigar and Gopal's father; Khimji's best friend; Mehul's business partner (2021)/(2021-2022)
 Anshul Trivedi as Khimji Bhujariya – Premji's best friend; Ratan's husband; Kalpesh and Anandi's father (2021)
 Riddhi Nayak Shukla as Ratan Sangwan Bhujariya – Pawan's sister; Khimji's wife; Kalpesh and Anandi's mother (2021)
 Shiju Kataria / Payal Shukla as Sejal Anjariya – Premji's widow; Jigar and Gopal's mother (2021)/(2021–2022)
 Seema Mishra as Diwali Anjariya Chauksia – Bhanumati and Devraj's daughter; Premji's sister; Lakhan's wife; Kanku's mother (2021)
 Chandan Rai as Lakhan Singh Chauksia – Diwali's husband; Kanku's father (2021)
 Trupti Mishra as Kanak "Kanku" Chauksia – Diwali and Lakhan's daughter; Jigar and Gopal's cousin; Madhav's ex-girlfriend (2021)
 Sagar Parekh as Madhav Jha – Kanku's ex-boyfriend (2021)
 Chirag Kukreja as Kalpesh Bhujariya – Ratan and Khimji's son; Jigar's friend; Anandi's brother (2021)
 Arisht Jain as Gopal Anjariya – Premji and Sejal's younger son; Jigar's brother (2021)
 Shekar Choudhary as Pawan Kumar Sangwan – Ratan's brother; Leela's ex-husband (2021)
 Rashmi Gupta as Leela Jain Sangwan – Pawan's wife (2021)
 Kumkum Das as Mitali "Mitaben" Jain – Leela's grandmother (2021)
 Vikas Grover as Vikrant – Diya's ex-husband (2021–2022)
 Pratiksha Rai as Kiara (2021)
 Melanie Pais as Dr. Sharda (2021)
 Sharhaan Singh as Varun (2022)

Production

Development
The reboot of Balika Vadhu was confirmed in early 2021. Casting was halted in April 2021 due to an imposed lockdown in Maharashtra because of the pandemic, and it resumed in June 2021. The teaser was released officially on 27 June 2021. The first promo was released on 18 July 2021 featuring Shreya Patel and confirming the premiere date.

Casting
In November 2021, the makers decided to introduce a time-leap in the show. Actress Shivangi Joshi was cast to play adult Anandi. Kinshuk Vaidya was earlier considered to play adult Jigar. However, the makers roped-in Randeep Rai to play the role opposite Joshi. Actor Samridh Bawa was cast to play adult Jigar in the show. The show was shifted to OTT platform Voot from 28 February 2022 and was replaced by Swaran Ghar.

Filming
The filming began in June 2021 where some initial sequences were shot at Rajasthan. The series is mainly filmed at the sets in Mumbai, Maharashtra.

References 

2021 Indian television series debuts
Hindi-language television shows
Indian television soap operas